Deng Jinghuang (born 24 January 1985) is a former Chinese-born Hong Kong professional football player who last played for Hong Kong Premier League club Pegasus. His usual positions are left-back and centre-back.

Career statistics

Club
As of 14 May 2008

International
As of 9 February 2011

External links
 Deng Jinghuang at HKFA
 Scaafc.com 球員資料 – 4. 鄧景煌 
 SCAA Official Blog 4號 鄧景煌 (Deng Jing Huang) 

1985 births
Living people
Footballers from Guangzhou
Chinese footballers
Hong Kong footballers
Guangzhou F.C. players
Hong Kong First Division League players
Hong Kong Premier League players
South China AA players
TSW Pegasus FC players
Expatriate footballers in Hong Kong
Hong Kong international footballers
Association football defenders